The Svarants mine is a large mine in the south of Armenia in Syunik Province. Svarants represents one of the largest iron reserves in Armenia, having estimated reserves of 1.5 billion tonnes of ore grading 40% iron. Sravants is controlled by Bounty Resources Armenia, and, in 2011, Fortune Oil acquired a 35% stake of Bounty Resources Armenia.

References 

Iron mines in Armenia